Svetlana Nikishina (born October 20, 1958) is a former volleyball player for the USSR. Born in Chelyabinsk, she competed for the Soviet Union at the 1980 Summer Olympics.

References 

1958 births
Living people
Sportspeople from Chelyabinsk
Soviet women's volleyball players
Olympic volleyball players of the Soviet Union
Olympic gold medalists for the Soviet Union
Olympic medalists in volleyball
Medalists at the 1980 Summer Olympics
Volleyball players at the 1980 Summer Olympics